Acquasale is a typical dish in southern Italian cuisine, especially in Campania, Basilicata, and Apulia.

It is made of stale bread, onions, tomatoes, peppers, eggs, olive oil, water, and salt. The onions are browned in oil, then the other ingredients are added. The mixture is poured onto stale bread in a soup dish.

References

Italian cuisine
Cuisine of Basilicata
Bread dishes